Asefabad or Asafabad may refer to:
 Asefabad, Fars
 Asefabad, Kurdistan
 Asefabad, Razavi Khorasan